Noguera is a comarca (county) in Catalonia, Spain. It is the largest comarca and its area represents some 5,56% of Catalonia. Noguera is part of the historical county of Urgell and currently belongs to the Province of Lleida. Its capital is Balaguer.

Municipalities

References

External links
Official comarcal web site (in Catalan)

 
Comarques of the Province of Lleida